Christeene Vale, known mononymously as Christeene, is an American drag queen, performance artist, singer-songwriter and rapper. Christeene is noted for untraditional, "terrorist drag," which features her wearing torn-up clothing, stringy matted black wigs, and heavy and smeared makeup with aims to expose hypocrisy and intolerance.

Early life
Christeene is a character created and performed by Paul Soileau.  Paul grew up in Lake Charles, Louisiana. He attended Loyola University New Orleans. Following college, he lived in New York City and New Orleans. After Hurricane Katrina, Soileau moved to Austin, Texas.

Career
Christeene is Soileau's second drag character, his first being Rebecca Havemeyer, who is similar to Barry Humphries' Dame Edna. "When Christeene came out of me," said Soileau, "I was searching for something that had the action of a switchblade in my pocket -- a character I could really put on quickly, but affect people in a much stronger way. Something strong enough to channel things inside of me that needed to come out -- more aggressive things. When everything aligned properly, Christine [sic] kind of just appeared. I found the wig and went to town... Both characters speak honestly from within me, but Christeene addresses issues that Rebecca does not. There's a lot of political and social commentary going on. It allows me to try to process and understand me, Paul -- as a queer, a Southern boy. Someone understanding my environment and my own social realms. I can push it out through this Christeene character."

Christeene's first public appearance was at Camp Camp, a queer open-mic show in Austin, Texas. In 2011, Christeene was a resident at the CentralTrak Artist Residency in Dallas, TX.

For his debut album Waste Up, Kneez Down, Christeene started a successful Kickstarter campaign, meeting her goal of $10,000.

Christeene contributed to the 2012 art magazine Satanica, which was printed in a limited edition of 350 copies. Other contributors included Bruce La Bruce and Michael Alig.

Music
Christeene's music videos are made by filmmaker PJ Raval. The final budget for each music video is around $200. For Christeene's first music video, "Fix My Dick", Raval borrowed a camera and they spent "about $20 on baby props from a thrift store." They finished the video in one day. The music video for "African Mayonnaise" was nominated for a SXSW Competition Award in 2012. Paul Soileau was an artist-in-residence in 2012 at CentralTrak.

He and PJ Raval developed new work for an experimental collaborative project entitled, "The O.T. (Old Testament)", giving Christeene a brief and much needed vacation.

Artistry
Christeene describes themselves as a genderqueer "drag terrorist," and is influenced by Jayne County and Bruce LaBruce's use of non-heteronormative gender roles and sexuality. Chelsea Weathers of Art Lies compared Christeene's "drag terrorism," sexual and racial commentary to Vaginal Davis: "the reflection Christeene offers includes the necessarily unsanitized underbelly of queer experience—the ambiguity of identifying as queer and the anger and humor that is part and parcel of that experience."

Discography

Albums
 Waste Up, Kneez Down (2012)
 Basura (2018)
 Midnite Fukk Train (2022)

Music videos

Filmography

References

External links
 Christeene Vale official website

American rappers
American drag queens
Living people
People with non-binary gender identities
21st-century American rappers
Year of birth missing (living people)
People from Austin, Texas
Non-binary drag performers
LGBT people from Louisiana
21st-century American LGBT people